Boota from Toba Tek Singh is a 1999 Pakistani drama serial. It was aired by Pakistan Television Corporation in Urdu language and had a total of 22 TV episodes. It was written by Khalil-Ur-Rehman Qamar, directed by Dilawar Malik. This drama serial was very popular back in 1999.

Plot 
The story revolves around a character Boota (Faisal Qureshi) who belongs to Toba Tek Singh and is the only son of a landlord. He is a mischievous fellow who has failed to do well in school. Boota changes overnight when he falls in love with Mahru (Farah Shah) whose car breaks down near his village when she and her grandmother (Khursheed Shahid) are going to Lahore. Boota soon runs away from home and goes to Lahore.

Mahru runs an advertising agency and her assistant Faani (Kashif Mehmood) takes Boota to the boarding house of Zohra Khatoon (Deeba) where he lives. Meeru (Babar Ali) is a fellow resident there who belongs to a broken home and hence has a shattered personality. He makes false promises to girls and then blackmails them after he gets their photos and letters.

Mahru loves him and tries to reason with him. Meeru falls in love with Mahru too but is afraid to admit it because he does not want to be in a position where someone else can exploit him.

This play was quite popular at that time (1999).

Cast 
 Faysal Qureshi as Boota
 Maria Wasti as Zulekha
 Babar Ali as Meeru
 Mishi Khan as Zoya
 Kashif Mehmood as Fani
 Farah Shah as Mehru
 Naima Khan as Sarwat Begum 
 Khalil-ur-Rehman Qamar
 Deeba as Zohra Begum
 Khursheed Shahid as Zohra's mother
 Nighat Butt as Boota's Mother
 Khalid Butt as Boota's Father
 Begum Khurshid Mirza as Mahru's Grandmother
 Mahmood Aslam as Kanwar Sarkhab
 Imran Ashraf

References

External links 
 Watch drama at Pak Point
 

Pakistani drama television series
Urdu-language television shows
Pakistan Television Corporation original programming
1990s Pakistani television series